Kulotino is the name of several inhabited localities in Russia.

Urban localities
Kulotino, Novgorod Oblast, a work settlement in Okulovsky District of Novgorod Oblast

Rural localities
Kulotino, Pskov Oblast, a village in Plyussky District of Pskov Oblast
Kulotino, Staritsky District, Tver Oblast, a village in Staritsky District, Tver Oblast
Kulotino, Vyshnevolotsky District, Tver Oblast, a village in Vyshnevolotsky District, Tver Oblast
Kulotino, Zubtsovsky District, Tver Oblast, a village in Zubtsovsky District, Tver Oblast
Kulotino, Yaroslavl Oblast, a village in Vereteysky Rural Okrug of Nekouzsky District of Yaroslavl Oblast